Sibari is a railway station in Sibari, Italy. The station is located on the Jonica railway and Cosenza–Sibari railway. The train services are operated by Trenitalia.

Train services
The station is served by the following service(s):

Intercity services Taranto - Sibari - Crotone - Catanzaro Lido - Roccela Jonica - Reggio Calabria
Regional services (Treno regionale) Metaponto - Monte Girodano - Sibari
Regional services (Treno regionale) Sibari - Crotone - Cantanzaro Lido
Regional services (Treno regionale) Cosenza - Sibari

References

This article is based upon a translation of the Italian language version as at October 2014.

Railway stations in Calabria
Buildings and structures in the Province of Cosenza
Railway stations opened in 1874